Northampton Town Football Club is an English association football club based in Northampton, England. The club was founded on 6 March 1897 by a group of local school teachers who got together with the local solicitor A.J "Pat" Darnell at The Princess Royal Inn, Wellingborough Road to form the town's first professional football club. Their initially chosen name was Northampton Football Club, but after objections from the town's rugby club, the club was called Northampton Town Football Club.
 
Northampton Town have had 35 managers appointed to the role on a permanent basis and a further four have taken the position in a caretaker role. The vast majority have been English. In 2017, former Dutch player Jimmy Floyd Hasselbaink became the first person from outside the British Isles to manage the club. A majority of the managerial changes have taken place in recent years including fifteen between 2001 and 2021.

Dave Bowen is the club's most successful manager so far, taking the club to the First Division for the only time. Herbert Chapman was in charge during the Cobblers's crown of the Southern Football League in 1908–09 and also the runners-up spot in the Charity Shield that proceeded the title.

List of managers

P = Matches played; W = Matches won; L = Matches lost; D = Matches drawn; Won % = Percentage of matches played that resulted in a win

References

External links
Managerial History for Northampton Town Soccerbase

Managers
 
Northampton Town